Nursery is an unincorporated community in the Similkameen Division Yale Land District of British Columbia. The community is east of Grand Forks, British Columbia.

References

Populated places in the Boundary Country